Cauquenes, a city and commune in Chile, is the capital of the Cauquenes Province and is located in the Maule Region.

History
According to the historical records of Alonso de Ercilla, Cauquenes was originally inhabited by an indigenous community of the Promaucaes, known as the Cauqui by the Inca or cauquenes by the Spanish and that gave their name to Cauquenes River. They lived to the south of the Maule River and north of the Itata River and owned a settlement in the place where the city lies today. The city of Cauquenes was founded on May 9, 1742, de "Villa of Nuestra Señora de las Mercedes de José de Manso del Tutuvén", in the land located between the rivers Tutuvén and Cauquenes, that the Promaucae cacique (chieftain) Ascensio Galdámez and his wife Micaela de Araya donated to the Kingdom of Spain. Cauquenes' founder was the then Governor of the Kingdom of Chile, José Antonio Manso de Velasco. The name of the city changed with time. With the law of 20 August 1826, which created the Maule Province, it became called "Villa de Cauquenes", and finally on 22 December of that year, it acquired the title of "Cauquenes".

Cauquenes is a toponym from the term "cauque", a salmonid species extinct today that inhabited the rivers of the area.

27 February 2010 earthquake
Cauquenes was damaged by the 8.8 magnitude earthquake and subsequent tsunami. Restoring power in the city in the immediate aftermath was impossible because of damage from the tsunami.

Demography
Of these, 30,771 (74.7%) lived in urban areas and 10,446 (25.3%) in rural areas. Between the 1992 and 2002 censuses, the population grew by 2.3% (938 persons).

Other localities in the commune of Cauquenes include the following:
 Sauzal, pop: 521
 Quella, pop: 346
 Santa Sofía, pop: 612

Geography
Altitude: 
Latitude: 35° 58' S
Longitude: 072° 21' W

Administration
As a commune, Cauquenes is a third-level administrative division of Chile administered by a municipal council, headed by an alcalde who is directly elected every four years. The 2008-2012 alcalde is Juan Carlos Muñoz Rojas (RN).The municipal council has the following members:
 Hernán Valenzuela Sepúlveda (PDC)
 Luis Ceroni García (PPD)
 Guillermo García González (UDI)
 Domingo Leiva Mena (PS)
 Manuel Vergara Del Río (RN)
 Alejandra Concha Urrutia (PPD)

Within the electoral divisions of Chile, Cauquenes is represented in the Chamber of Deputies by Ignacio Urrutia (UDI), Rolando Rentería (UDI), Manuel Matta (PDC) and Jaime Naranjo (PS) as part of the 18th electoral district. The commune is represented in the Senate Ximena Rincón González (PDC), Juan Castro Prieto (Ind-RN), Rodrigo Galilea Vial (RN), Juan Antonio Coloma Correa (UDI) and Álvaro Elizalde Soto (PS) as part of the 9th senatorial constituency (Maule).

External links

  Municipality of Cauquenes
  "Ficha Comunal de Cauquenes"
 Cauquenes in Google Maps

References

Populated places in Cauquenes Province
Communes of Chile
Capitals of Chilean provinces
Populated places established in 1742
1742 establishments in the Spanish Empire